William Fermor, 1st Baron Leominster (alias Lempster) (3 August 1648 – 7 December 1711), styled  Sir William Fermor, 2nd Baronet from 1661 to 1692, was an English politician and peer.

Biography

Fermor was the second but eldest surviving son of Sir William Fermor, 1st Baronet (1621-1661) (alias Farmer), of Easton Neston, Northamptonshire, by his wife Mary Perry, widow of Henry Noel, second son of Edward Noel, 2nd Viscount Campden and a daughter of Hugh Perry of the City of London.

Fermor was educated at Magdalen College, Oxford. He succeeded as second baronet in 1661, was elected a Member of Parliament for Northampton in 1671 and again in 1679.

He was elevated to the peerage on 12 April 1692, as Baron Leominster (alias Lempster) of Leominster, Herefordshire.

Easton Neston

Leominster re-built the mansion house at Easton Neston and planned the gardens and plantations, the wings being to the design of Sir Christopher Wren with the house completed 20 years later in 1702 to the design of Nicholas Hawksmoor. He adorned the whole with part of the Arundel marbles which he had purchased and which his son attempted to restore with the assistance of the Italian sculptor Giovanni Battista Guelfi, a scholar of Camillo Rusconi. The collection was afterwards greatly neglected. Horace Walpole wrote as follows to George Montagu on 20 May 1736: "Coming back, we saw Easton Neston, where in an old greenhouse is a wonderful fine statue of Tully haranguing a numerous assembly of decayed emperors, vestal virgins with new noses, Colossus's, Venus's, headless carcases, and carcaseless heads, pieces of tombs, and hieroglyphics." The marbles were presented in 1755 to the University of Oxford by Henrietta Louisa, Countess of Pomfret. A description of Easton Neston and its art treasures is included in the Catalogue of the Duke of Buckingham's Pictures.

Marriage and issue

Fermor married three times: 
Firstly, to Jane Barker, a daughter of Andrew Barker of Fairford, Gloucestershire. Andrew Barker was of the ancient Barker (alias Coverall) family of Coverall Castle and Hopton Castle both in Shropshire, and had acquired the manor of Fairford in about 1660. By Jane Barker he had a daughter:
Elizabeth Fermor (d. March 1705), who died unmarried. She spent the large sum of £200 in protecting the magnificent 1490s Fairford stained glass windows in Fairford Church.
Secondly, he married Catherine Poulett, a daughter of John Poulett, 3rd Baron Poulett, by whom he a daughter:
Mary Fermor, who married Sir John Wodehouse, 4th Baronet, of Kimberley, Norfolk.
Thirdly, he married Lady Sophia Osborne (1661–1746), widow of Donough, Lord Ibrackan (grandson and heir of Henry O'Brien, 7th Earl of Thomond), and daughter of Thomas Osborne, 1st Duke of Leeds by his wife Lady Bridget Bertie, a daughter of Montagu Bertie, 2nd Earl of Lindsey. By Sophia he had five children including:
Thomas Fermor, 1st Earl of Pomfret, only son and heir.
 Matilda Fermor, who married Edward Conyers, MP, of Copt Hall.

Death and succession
Fermor died on 7 December 1711, and was succeeded by his only son, Thomas Fermor, who was created Earl of Pomfret (i.e. Pontefract, Yorkshire) on 27 December 1721.

References

1648 births
1711 deaths
18th-century English people
People from West Northamptonshire District
Barons in the Peerage of England
Peers of England created by William III
English MPs 1661–1679